245th Brigade may refer to:

 245th Weapons and Equipment Storage Base (Russia)
 245th Mixed Brigade (Spain)